Kilbourne is a census-designated place in eastern Brown Township, Delaware County, Ohio, United States. As of the 2010 census it had a population of 139. The community has a post office with the ZIP code of 43032. It lies along State Route 521.

Demographics

History
Kilbourne was originally called Eden. A post office called Kilbourne was in operation since 1837 but was closed in 2017. The community has the name of James Kilbourne, surveyor.

References

Census-designated places in Delaware County, Ohio